Nanney is a surname of Welsh origin Nannau, who were descendants of the princes of Powys, and their country estate at Dolgellau, North Wales.

 Hugh Ellis-Nanney (1845–1920), British landowner, magistrate and Conservative politician
 Kevin "PPMD" Nanney (born 1990), professional Super Smash Bros. Melee player
 Richard Nanney (1691–1767), 18th-century evangelical priest in north Wales
 Wendy Nanney (born 1965), Republican member of the South Carolina House of Representatives

Surnames of Welsh origin